Puzzle Kingdoms is a puzzle video game developed by Infinite Interactive for PC, Nintendo DS and Wii. The PC version is available to download online through services such as IGN's Direct2Drive and Steam.

Like Infinite Interactive's previous game Puzzle Quest: Challenge of the Warlords, Puzzle Kingdom relies on a core combat mechanic similar to Bejeweled, though this offering incorporates turn-based strategy elements as well. Puzzle Kingdom also shares the same game universe as Puzzle Quest, the fantasy world of Etheria from the Warlords game series.

Reception 

Puzzle Kingdoms received mixed reviews from critics upon release. On Metacritic, the game holds scores of 64/100 for the DS version based on 12 reviews, and 63/100 for the Wii version based on 11 reviews. On GameRankings, the game holds scores of 64.36% for the DS version based on 11 reviews, and 59.11% for the Wii version based on 9 reviews.

See also 
 List of puzzle video games

References 

2009 video games
Nintendo DS games
Wii games
Puzzle video games
Windows games
Video games developed in Australia
Video games featuring protagonists of selectable gender
Infinity Plus Two games